Igor Vladimirovich Akinfeev (born 8 April 1986) is a Russian professional footballer who plays as a goalkeeper for and captains Russian club CSKA Moscow.

He has spent his entire career at CSKA, making more than 700 official appearances. He has won six Russian Premier League titles and six Russian Cups, as well as the UEFA Cup in 2005. He is a record holder for most games played in the Russian top-level league at 534 (as of 19 March 2023).

A full international for Russia between 2004 and 2018, he earned 111 caps and was selected in their squads for four UEFA European Championships and two FIFA World Cups. He was named captain of Russia in March 2017, after the retirement of his predecessor Vasili Berezutski.

Akinfeev is a member of the Lev Yashin Club and has kept more clean sheets in Russian football than any other goalkeeper.

Early life
Igor Akinfeev was born on 8 April 1986 in the town of Vidnoye in Moscow Oblast. When he was 4 years old his father sent him to the Sports school of CSKA. He has been a goalkeeper since his second training. As a member of the junior CSKA Moscow team he won the Russian Junior Championship in 2002.

Club career

Akinfeev made his professional debut for CSKA Moscow at the age of 16, saving a penalty kick and keeping a clean sheet in a 2–0 win over FC Krylia Sovetov Samara. He broke into the starting line-up at the age of 17 in 2003, winning the club's first Russian Premier League in the same season. In 2005, CSKA won a treble of the Russian Premier League Russian Cup and UEFA Cup. During this season, Akinfeev played in all 19 of CSKA's European matches, including the 2005 UEFA Cup Final, which the Army Men won 3–1 against Sporting CP at their opponents' Estádio José Alvalade. In 2006, he won a third Russian league title and second Russian Cup with CSKA and was awarded the Zvezda trophy, for the year's best football player from the former Soviet Union.

In the 2006–07 UEFA Champions League, Akinfeev went 362 minutes without conceding a goal until Ricardo Quaresma scored past him for FC Porto in his team's fifth group match. This began a record breaking run of 43 consecutive matches without keeping a clean sheet in the Champions League. His Champions League run without a clean sheet finally ended 11 years later, when CSKA Moscow beat AEK Athens 2–0 away in the qualifying stages of the Champions League on 25 July 2017; prior to the match, Akinfeev's last clean sheet in the Champions League had come against Arsenal in November 2006.

In May 2007, Akinfeev sustained a knee injury which kept him out for the remainder of the 2007 Russian Premier League season. CSKA ended the season third in the league behind city rivals Spartak Moscow and champions Zenit St. Petersburg. Akinfeev returned for the 2008 season, starting in all 30 league matches and winning the Russian Cup. In 2009, he again started all 30 Russian Premier League matches and kept a clean sheet in the 1–0 Russian Cup Final defeat of league winners Rubin Kazan.

In May 2011, Akinfeev captained CSKA to a fifth Russian Cup of his career. In 2012–13, CSKA won their first Russian Premier League title in seven years, with Akinfeev named Russian Footballer of the Year. Akinfeev also saved Yuri Zhirkov's kick in CSKA's penalty shootout win over Anzhi Makhachkala in the 2013 Russian Cup Final.

On 1 February 2014, CSKA Moscow announced that Akinfeev had extended his contract CSKA until the summer of 2019.
In 2013–14, Akinfeev won a fifth Russian Premier League title. On 14 May 2014, he overtook Lev Yashin as the goalkeeper with the third-highest number of clean sheets in Russian football. On 14 November 2015, he broke this clean sheet record with his 233rd career shutout in the Russia national football team's 1–0 win over Portugal.

In August 2018, Akinfeev extended his CSKA contract to last until 2022.

In December 2018, Akinfeev earned his 300th clean sheet, becoming the first Russian goalkeeper to do so.

On 14 August 2021, he played his 489th game in the Russian top tier, repeating the record previously set by Sergei Ignashevich. In his next game on 21 August 2021, he set a new record with 490.

On 20 May 2022, Akinfeev extended his contract with CSKA until the end of the 2023–24 season.

International career
Akinfeev made his debut for the Russian national team in a friendly match against Norway, which Russia lost 2–3, on 28 April 2004, aged 18 years and 20 days. He thus became the third youngest player to compete for Russia after Eduard Streltsov and Sergey Rodionov and the youngest international footballer ever in the history of the Russian Federation. He held the record for the youngest national team player for 18 years before being overtaken by Sergei Pinyayev in 2022. He was later included into the Russian UEFA Euro 2004 squad as the third choice goalkeeper behind Sergei Ovchinnikov and Vyacheslav Malafeev.

His major competitive debut was on 30 March 2005, in a 2006 FIFA World Cup qualifier against Estonia and he was later promoted to Russia's first-choice goalkeeper after a long-term injury to Malafeev. Akinfeev kept his first choice place under Yuri Semin and later Guus Hiddink. On 6 May 2007, Akinfeev suffered a knee injury in a 1–1 draw against FC Rostov which put him out of action for four months. As a result, he lost his first choice position to Vyacheslav Malafeev and later Vladimir Gabulov. He returned to the Russian national squad in early November but was deemed unfit for the UEFA Euro 2008 qualifier against Israel. Akinfeev later re-established his first choice place for Russia at UEFA Euro 2008, and played every match as the nation reached the semi-finals.

He was confirmed for the finalized UEFA Euro 2012 squad on 25 May 2012, but Malafeev played all of Russia's matches and the nation was eliminated in the group stages. On 2 June 2014, Akinfeev was included in Russia's 2014 FIFA World Cup squad,

In Russia's first group match of the 2014 FIFA World Cup against South Korea, Akinfeev fumbled a long-range shot from Lee Keun-ho, dropping it over the line to give the Koreans the lead. Russia then went on to equalize, and the match finished 1–1. The final group stage match between Algeria and Russia on 26 June ended 1–1, advancing Algeria and eliminating Russia. A win for Russia would have seen them qualify, and they led the game 1–0 after six minutes. In the 60th minute of the game, a green laser was shone in Akinfeev's face while he was defending from an Algerian free kick, from which Islam Slimani scored to equalise. Both Akinfeev and Russian coach Fabio Capello blamed the laser for the decisive conceded goal.

On 27 March 2015, in a Euro 2016 Group G qualifier away to Montenegro, Akinfeev was struck in the head by a flare launched from the crowd, 20 seconds after kick-off. The game was called off for 35 minutes while he was treated, and resumed with his substitution for Yuri Lodygin. It was eventually abandoned after a brawl, while Akinfeev was taken to a Podgorica hospital with a neck injury and light burns. Akinfeev played his third UEFA European Championship for Russia at UEFA Euro 2016 as the national team finished bottom of Group B with only one point from three matches.

He was selected as captain for Russia's 2017 FIFA Confederations Cup campaign on home soil and kept a clean sheet as the Russian's defeated New Zealand 2–0 in the tournament's opening match. On 21 June, in Russia's second group match, a 1–0 defeat to Portugal, Akinfeev won his 100th cap for the national team.

On 11 May 2018, he was included in Russia's extended 2018 FIFA World Cup squad. On 3 June 2018, he was included in the finalized World Cup squad. Akinfeev was later instrumental in the Russians knocking out Spain in the Round of 16, being elected Man of the Match and saving two penalties in the shoot-out, ensuring a Russian victory.

On 1 October 2018, he announced his retirement from the national team.

Style of play
Regarded as a promising talent in his youth, Akinfeev's precocious performances as a youngster earned him comparisons with former esteemed Russian goalkeepers Lev Yashin and Rinat Dasayev. In 2005, UEFA's Pavle Gognidze praised Akinfeev for being a "cool-headed" goalkeeper in spite of his young age, commenting: "On top of confidence, Akinfeev can also boast cat-like reflexes and excellent aerial ability while he is quick off his line to deal with crosses and through balls. Handy with his kicks, what makes him so remarkable for his age is his positional sense – so well developed that the ball seems drawn towards him." Former goalkeeper and CSKA's goalkeeping coach at the time, Vyacheslav Chanov, also added: "Igor is a real goalkeeper, it's in his character and attitude. Since the age of four he only dreamed of becoming a goalkeeper. He's very confident. I think he also tops all Russian goalkeepers in the length and precision of his goal kicks. With his right, he kicks 90 metres, with his left 80 metres."

Career statistics

Club

1Includes UEFA Europa League and UEFA Champions League.
2Includes Russian Super Cup, Russian Premier League Cup and UEFA Super Cup.

International
Appearances and goals by national team and year

Honours
CSKA Moscow	
 Russian Premier League: 2003, 2005, 2006, 2012–13, 2013–14, 2015–16
 Russian Cup: 2004–05, 2005–06, 2007–08, 2008–09, 2010–11, 2012–13	
 Russian Super Cup: 2004, 2006, 2007, 2009, 2013, 2014, 2018
 UEFA Cup: 2004–05

Russia
 UEFA European Championship bronze medalist: 2008

Individual
 2012–13 Russian Premier League Player of the Year	
 Baltic and Commonwealth of Independent States Footballer of the Year ("Star") by Sport-Express (2006)	
 The best young football player of Russian Premier League (2005)	
 List of 33 best football player of the Russian Championship: # 1 (2005, 2006, 2008, 2009, 2010, 2012/13, 2013/14); # 2 (2011/2012); # 3 (2004).	
 The best Russian goalkeeper according to Russian Football Union (2008, 2009, 2010)	
 The best goalkeeper of the Russian Premier League: 2021–22
 The best young goalkeeper of Europe (2008)	
 Member of Lev Yashin Club	
 Russian CSKA Prize "Golden Horseshoe": one golden horseshoe (2010) and four silver horseshoe (2005, 2006, 2008, 2009)	
 Order of Friendship (2006) 	
 Lev Yashin Prize "Goalkeeper of the year" (2004, 2005, 2006, 2008, 2009, 2010)

See also 
 List of men's footballers with 100 or more international caps
 List of one-club men in association football

Notes

References

External links

 CSKA Moscow profile
 Igor Akinfeev at Forbes

1986 births
Living people
People from Vidnoye
Russian footballers
Association football goalkeepers
PFC CSKA Moscow players
UEFA Cup winning players
Russian Premier League players
Russia under-21 international footballers
Russia international footballers
UEFA Euro 2004 players
UEFA Euro 2008 players
UEFA Euro 2012 players
2014 FIFA World Cup players
UEFA Euro 2016 players
2017 FIFA Confederations Cup players
2018 FIFA World Cup players
FIFA Century Club
Sportspeople from Moscow Oblast